"U-S-A!" is a chant of the United States of America's initials popular in expressing American pride and supporting American national sports teams. It is also used in other community events, such as at political rallies.

Origins
The first documented usage of a U-S-A chant was in 1918 at a Bethlehem Steel plant in Lebanon, Pennsylvania.

Use in sports

The film Olympia: Festival of Nations, documenting the 1936 Summer Olympics, includes the chant during the finals of the 1,500 meter event and the long jump. It was also documented at the 1972 Summer Olympics in Munich, Germany, during the basketball tournament final between the United States and the Soviet Union. In 1979, the chant was used in Budapest when the national men's teams of Hungary and the United States played against each other.

However, the chant was popularized in the context of ice hockey at the 1980 Winter Olympics. During the U.S.' 7–3 win over Czechoslovakia in the second game, the crowd began chanting "U-S-A! U-S-A!" in support of the U.S. hockey team as the U.S. scored a decisive win over one of the best teams in the world. The chant became a fixture of the team's remaining games and gained national attention after the U.S. defeated the Soviet Union in what became known as the "Miracle on Ice", later moving on to beat Finland for the gold medal.

Use in professional wrestling

In professional wrestling, "Hacksaw" Jim Duggan was popularly known for making the cheer during his wrestling matches and inciting the crowd to repeat it after him. The chant has also been used by fans to taunt characters who dislike the U.S., such as Canadian star Bret Hart, who was beloved in the United States but turned his back on the country during an infamous 1997 storyline; the Bulgarian-born Rusev, who was portrayed as hailing from Russia and pledged his allegiance to Russia and its president Vladimir Putin throughout 2014/2015, all while bashing the United States alongside his manager Lana; and most recently, Kevin Owens, who, ever since capturing the United States Championship at WrestleMania 33 against Chris Jericho, proclaimed himself as "The Face of America" despite hailing from a small town near Montreal, and would constantly remind the WWE Universe that Canada is better than the United States.  He would also sometimes speak in his native French during his promos in order to draw further heel heat. It has also been used to support wrestlers with pro-U.S. gimmicks, like Hulk Hogan, regardless of the nationality of their opponents.

Usage
In May 1969, it was used in Plzeň, Czechoslovakia to commemorate the city's liberation by American and Polish forces at the end of World War II. During the 1984 United States presidential election, the chant "U.S.A.!" was heard at numerous campaign rallies for incumbent President Ronald Reagan; it was also heard at events throughout his presidency, including a visit to Port Washington, Wisconsin.

Post 9/11 usage

The September 11 attacks of 2001 found a revival in the chant during patriotic ceremonies at sporting events; the chant was also heard when U.S. President George W. Bush visited the ruins at the World Trade Center site in the week following the 2001 attacks. Following the throwing of the first pitch during the 2001 World Series, the crowd chanted "U-S-A", when the pitch was a strike.

Crowds gathered outside of the White House on May 1, 2011 could be heard chanting "U-S-A!" after President Barack Obama announced that al-Qaeda co-founder Osama bin Laden had been killed by U.S. forces in Pakistan. However, minutes before the announcement, crowds with plates and U.S flags in New York had gathered at Times Square and Ground Zero (where the towers were located) for celebrating the successful operation, chanting "U-S-A!" repeatedly. The cheer was also chanted that Sunday evening at the only MLB baseball game being held while the news was breaking, between the Philadelphia Phillies and the New York Mets. At the 2011 WWE Extreme Rules event in Tampa, Florida on the same date, the arena erupted in U-S-A chants as the death of Osama bin Laden was announced by then WWE Champion, John Cena.

Use of the chant at a sporting event in 2013 at Adolfo Camarillo High School caused some controversy due to alleged "racist overtones".

Several participants in the 2021 United States Capitol attack were shown chanting "U-S-A!" in police bodycam footage.

Satirical usage
The "U-S-A" chant has been adopted by English football supporters during matches against Manchester United, who have U.S. owners unpopular with the club's supporters due to the club's being saddled by massive debt. Opposing supporters remind the United supporters of this with the "U-S-A" chant; this was also true of Liverpool, until the RBS takeover. However, the chant is also used non-sarcastically by British supporters to celebrate achievements of U.S. players such as Tim Howard at Everton and Christian Pulisic at Chelsea.

The chant, led by Woody Boyd, was used in the Cheers episode "A Fine French Whine" upon hearing the news that a French citizen with eyes on Boyd's girlfriend has overstayed his visa and would soon be deported. It has shown up on The Jerry Springer Show, where it may spontaneously and without apparent reason follow the show's standard cheer of "Jer-ry, Jer-ry!" and is also often delivered by Homer Simpson on The Simpsons as a celebration of almost anything, often accompanied by honking of his car's horn and flashing of its headlights. The chant is also used on It's Always Sunny in Philadelphia when the gang come up with a plan.

See also
 Aussie Aussie Aussie, Oi Oi Oi

References



American popular culture
Chants
American patriotism